The National Conference of Tripura (NCT) is a new regional political party of the state of Tripura, India formed in December 2006 at Darjeelingpara in Teliamura. It was formed by Rabindra Kishore Debbarma, formerly of the GMP of the Communist Party of India (Marxist) (CPIM) in Tripura, and Animesh Debbarma of Indigenous Nationalist Party of Twipra (INPT). The NCT included many disaffected members of the Twipra Students Union, the Tribal Youth Federation and the GMP of the CPIM party in Tripura, and leaders from INPT. The NCT contested the 2013 state elections but did not win any seats.

Election in Tripura State Legislative Assembly 2018

Contesting Candidates
Animesh Debbarma at 24-Ramchandraghat (ST)
Rajesh Kumar at 26-Asharambari (ST)
Kripajay Reang at 29-Krishnapur (ST)

Prominent Leaders and Spokesperson
Animesh Debbarma is a former MLA of Tripura Legislative Assembly from Pramodnagar Constituency   2008 to 2013 who was an ex-spokesperson of Indigenous Nationalist People of Twipra(INPT) and prominent chief leader of the National Conference of Tripura 
Kripajay Reang is a former member of INPT as well as the contesting candidate for INPT in 2003 .He is the current Secretary-General of NCT and the main spokesperson of NCT in Tripura Tribal Areas Autonomous District Council

Contesting Candidates in Tripura Legislative Assembly 2018

References

Political parties in Tripura
2006 establishments in Tripura
Political parties established in 2006
Indigenous People's Front of Tripura